Marcel Müller (born July 10, 1988) is  German professional ice hockey left winger currently playing with Krefeld Pinguine in the DEL2.

Playing career
Müller began playing professionally with Eisbären Berlin of the Deutsche Eishockey Liga in the 2005–06 season. He played with Berlin and their junior team in the third-level Oberliga for two seasons. He then joined the Kölner Haie in 2007.

The 2009–10 season was his most successful season in the DEL scoring wise with the Kölner Haie accounting for 56 points in 53 games during the regular season. He has also received a career high total of 122 penalty minutes. Müller was selected to play for the German national team for the 2010 Winter Olympics.

On July 14, 2010, Müller signed a two-year entry level contract with the Toronto Maple Leafs. In his first season, after initially being assigned to affiliate, the Toronto Marlies for the 2010–11 season, Mueller was recalled and on January 15, 2011 he played his first NHL regular season game, a shootout loss to Calgary at home.

Unable to establish a role with the Maple Leafs, on July 20, 2012, Müller left to sign with the MoDo Hockey of the Swedish Elitserien. In signing with Modo, Mueller also became the franchise's inaugural German player.

After one season with Modo, Müller returned to his native Germany and signed with former club, Kölner Haie on June 28, 2013. In his second season in cologne, Mueller left after 6 games in switching to Krefeld Pinguine for the remainder of the campaign.

On April 28, 2015, Müller signed a three-year contract as a free agent to join his fourth DEL team, the Hamburg Freezers.

After the Freezers pull-out from the DEL 2016, he returned to his previous club for the 2016–17 season with Krefeld Pinguine. He featured in 43 games with the Pinguine, producing 37 points before leaving on February 15, 2017, as he inked a deal with Swedish SHL team Linköping HC for the remainder of the campaign.

As a free agent, Müller opted to again return to Krefeld to play in his third stint with the club on a one-year deal on April 25, 2017. In the 2017–18 season, Müller appeared in 43 games with Krefeld to lead the club with 24 goals and 52 points. While out of playoff contention, Müller left Krefeld to play out the remainder of the season with Swedish club, Leksands IF of the HockeyAllsvenskan in their bid for promotion to the SHL.

On April 6, 2018, Müller opted for another third stint in returning to former club, Kölner Haie, on a one-year contract.

As a free agent, on May 11, 2022, Müller signed a three-year contract with newly relegated Krefeld Pinguine of the DEL2, with the ambition to return the club to the top flight in his third stint with the club.

Career statistics

Regular season and playoffs

International

References

External links

1988 births
Living people
Eisbären Berlin players
German ice hockey left wingers
Hamburg Freezers players
Ice hockey people from Berlin
Ice hockey players at the 2010 Winter Olympics
Kölner Haie players
Krefeld Pinguine players
Leksands IF players
Linköping HC players
Modo Hockey players
Olympic ice hockey players of Germany
Toronto Maple Leafs players
Toronto Marlies players
Undrafted National Hockey League players